The following is a list of notable events and releases that happened in 2015 in music in Australia.

Events

January

February

March
5 March - At a press conference in the Sydney Opera House, SBS announces the selection of Guy Sebastian to represent Australia in the Eurovision Song Contest 2015, with the song, "Tonight Again".

April

May
23 May - Australia, represented by Guy Sebastian, finishes in fifth place in the Eurovision Song Contest 2015 with a total of 196 points.

June

July
24–26 July – Splendour in the Grass 2015 is held at North Byron Parklands in Yelgun, New South Wales, headlined by Blur, Florence and the Machine and Mark Ronson.

August

September

October

November

December

Bands disbanded

Album and Single releases

Albums
30 October - Eleven by Tina Arena

Deaths
19 February – Warren Thomson, 79, pianist
18 August – Roger Smalley, 72, pianist
11 October – John Murphy, 56, musician
27 December – Stevie Wright, 68, musician and songwriter, lead singer of The Easybeats

See also
Australia in the Eurovision Song Contest 2015
List of number-one singles of 2015 (Australia)
List of number-one albums of 2015 (Australia)

References

 
Australian
Australian music